Philarista porphyrinella is a moth of the family Xyloryctidae. It is found from southern Queensland to southern New South Wales, where it occurs both inland and near the coast.

The wingspan is about 32 mm. The forewings are creamy-ochreous with a purplish dark grey band from the costal half of the base of wing. The hindwings are yellow-ochreous, the hindmargin black with short fine transverse black lines.

Larvae have been recorded tunnelling the stems of Exocarpos cupressiformis.

References

 Natural History Museum Lepidoptera generic names catalog

Xyloryctinae
Moths described in 1864